Todd McNutt (born 26 November 1964) is a Canadian former cyclist. He competed in the team time trial at the 1992 Summer Olympics.

References

External links
 

1964 births
Living people
Canadian male cyclists
Olympic cyclists of Canada
Cyclists at the 1992 Summer Olympics
Sportspeople from Calgary